East India Company Act is a stock short title used in the United Kingdom for legislation relating to the East India Company.

List
The East India Company Act 1697 (9 Will c.44)
The East India Company Act 1707 (6 Ann c.3)
The East India Company Act 1773
The East India Company Act 1784
The East India Company Act 1793 (33 Geo 3 c 52)
The East India Company Act 1813
The East India Company Act 1833
The East India Company Act 1853

The East India Company (Money) Acts 1786 to 1858 was the collective title of the following Acts:
The East India Company (Money) Act 1786 (26 Geo 3 c 62)
The East India Company (Money) Act 1788 (28 Geo 3 c 29)
The East India Company (Money) Act 1789 (29 Geo 3 c 65)
The East India Company (Money) Act 1791 (31 Geo 3 c 11)
The East India Company (Money) Act 1793 (33 Geo 3 c 47)
The East India Company (Money) Act 1794 (34 Geo 3 c 41)
The East India Company Bonds Act 1811 (51 Geo 3 c 64)
The East India Loans Act 1858 (21 & 22 Vict c 3)

The East India Loans Acts 1859 to 1893 was the collective title of the following Acts:
The East India Loan Act 1859 (22 Vict c 11)
The East India Loan (No. 2) Act 1859 (22 & 23 Vict c 39)
The Indian Securities Act 1860 (23 & 24 Vict c 5)
The East India Stock Act 1860 (23 & 24 Vict c 102)
The East India Loan Act 1860 (23 & 24 Vict c 130)
The East India Loan Act 1861 (24 & 25 Vict c 25)
The India Stock Transfer Act 1862 (25 & 26 Vict c 7)
The India Stock Certificate Act 1863 (26 & 27 Vict c 73)
The East India Loan Act 1869 (32 & 33 Vict c 106)
The India Stock Dividends Act 1871 (34 & 35 Vict c 29)
The East India Stock Dividend Redemption Act 1873 (36 & 37 Vict c 17)
The East India Loan Act 1873 (36 & 37 Vict c 32)
The East India Loan Act 1874 (37 & 38 Vict c 3)
The East India Loan Act 1877 (40 & 41 Vict c 51)
The East India Loan Act 1879 (42 & 43 Vict c 60)
The India Stock (Powers of Attorney) Act 1880 (43 Vict c 11)
The East India Unclaimed Stock Act 1885 (48 & 49 Vict c 25)
The East India Loan Act 1885 (48 & 49 Vict c 28)
The East India Loan Act 1893 (56 & 57 Vict c 70)

See also
List of short titles
Government of India Act 1833
Government of India Act 1858

References

Lists of legislation by short title and collective title